Reidsdale is a locality in the Queanbeyan–Palerang Regional Council, New South Wales, Australia. It is located about 17 km southeast of Braidwood. It had a school from 1883 to 1923 and from 1943 to 1946, operating as a "public school" until 1922 and then as a "provisional" school".

References

Localities in New South Wales
Queanbeyan–Palerang Regional Council
Southern Tablelands